Sharna May Burgess (born 21 June 1985) is an Australian ballroom dancer who is best known for being a professional partner and troupe member on the ABC series Dancing with the Stars. She is the winner of season 27 of American television show Dancing with the Stars with her celebrity partner Bobby Bones, where she has also been a runner-up in several other seasons. She has also been a judge on the Australian version of the show since 2019, along with Craig Revel Horwood and Tristan MacManus.

Early life
Burgess was born in Wagga Wagga, New South Wales, Australia to Ray and Lucy Burgess. Growing up, she was involved in several sports and different styles of dance. At the age of five, she began training in ballet, jazz and gymnastics. When she turned eight, her study of ballroom began, and she went on to win many local and national titles. At age 15, she was chosen to represent Australia at the World Championships in both the Standard and Latin styles, and performed in the 2000 Summer Olympics Closing Ceremonies.

Career
At age 18, Burgess moved to London, where she collected numerous titles and appeared in a UK tour with the show, Simply Ballroom. Post Simply Ballroom, choreographer Jason Gilkison gave her a spot on tour with Burn the Floor. She was in the cast for six years. Burgess was a member of the Burn the Floor cast when the show moved to Broadway.

Burgess' first television appearances were on the Australian Dancing with the Stars and So You Think You Can Dance in Belgium and the Netherlands. She joined the cast of season 13 of Dancing with the Stars as a troupe member. While on the troupe, she also assisted So You Think You Can Dance choreographer Jason Gilkison on both the Australian and American versions of the show.  She remained on the troupe until the end of season 15. For season 16, Burgess was bumped to regular pro and was partnered with Andy Dick. She returned as a professional for season 17, this time partnered with retired NFL star Keyshawn Johnson. They were the first couple eliminated. For season 18, she was paired with Olympic ice dancer Charlie White. They were eliminated during week 9 (the semi-finals) and ended in 5th place despite raves from the judges and high scores throughout the season. Sharna was then confirmed for season 19 on 27 August. For season 19, she paired with talk-show host Tavis Smiley. They were eliminated on week 2, finishing in 12th place.

For season 20, Burgess was paired with combat veteran and motivational speaker, Noah Galloway. The pair made it to the finals and finished in third place. For season 21, she was paired with Backstreet Boys singer Nick Carter. The couple made it to the finals and ended in second place behind winners Bindi Irwin, and her partner Derek Hough. For season 22, she was paired with NFL player Antonio Brown. The couple made it to the semi-finals but were eliminated and finished in 4th place. For season 23, Burgess was partnered with race car driver James Hinchcliffe. Due to a knee injury from the previous week's dress rehearsal, Burgess had to sit out during week 8-9. Jenna Johnson substituted for her as Hinchcliffe's partner. The couple made it to the finals, and finished in 2nd place behind winners Laurie Hernandez and her partner Valentin Chmerkovskiy.

For season 24, Burgess was partnered with professional bull rider Bonner Bolton. The couple were eliminated on week 8, and finished in fifth place. Burgess returned for season 25 and was paired with former NBA player, Derek Fisher. The couple were eliminated on week 4, and finished in eleventh place. For season 26, she was paired with NFL player Josh Norman. The pair made it to the finals, finishing in second place overall. For season 27, she was partnered with radio personality Bobby Bones. Despite low scores from the judges, they were consistently saved by the viewers' votes and won the competition. On 2 February 2019, it was announced that Burgess was joining the Australian version of the reality dancing competition series as its sole female judge. Burgess did not appear on season 28 of the American version. She returned the following year for season 29 of the American version and was partnered with actor Jesse Metcalfe. The couple was eliminated in the fifth week of competition and finished in 12th place.

Performances on Dancing with the Stars

Season 16: Celebrity partner Andy Dick

 Average: 19.3
 Placed: 7th

In an interview with Access Hollywood, Burgess admitted she knew nothing of Dick's tumultuous past, due to the fact that she was living out of the country.
Andy and Sharna continually received low scores and harsh criticisms from the judges. However, Burgess was praised for her work with him.

Season 17: Celebrity partner Keyshawn Johnson

 Average: 17.5
 Placed: 12th

Season 18: Celebrity partner Charlie White

 Average: 27.0
 Placed: 5th

Season 19: Celebrity partner Tavis Smiley 

 Average: 28.5
 Placed: 12th

Season 20: Celebrity partner Noah Galloway 

 Average: 32.9
 Placed: 3rd

Season 21: Celebrity partner Nick Carter

 Average: 27.2
 Placed: 2nd

Season 22: Celebrity partner Antonio Brown

 Average: 24.7
 Placed: 4th

Season 23: Celebrity partner James Hinchcliffe 

 Average: 36.6
 Placed: 2nd

Season 24: Celebrity partner Bonner Bolton

 Average: 28.9
 Placed: 5th

Season 25: Celebrity partner Derek Fisher

 Average: 20.0
 Placed: 11th

Season 26: Celebrity partner Josh Norman

 Average: 25.8
 Placed: 2nd

Season 27: Celebrity partner Bobby Bones

 Average: 22.8
 Placed: 1st

Season 29: Celebrity partner Jesse Metcalfe 

 Average: 19.6
 Placed: 12th

Season 30: Celebrity partner Brian Austin Green 

 Average: 24.8
 Placed: 13th

Personal life
After her performance in the World Championships semi-finals, Burgess discovered she had a small tear in her knee ligament. Rather than take immediate action, she insisted on finishing the competition. She needed knee ligament reconstruction surgery because she ripped two ligaments in half and lost all the meniscus in one knee.

She dated choreographer and dancer Paul Kirkland from 2010 to 2015.

She is currently dating Brian Austin Green. They met in 2020 after being set up by mutual friends. In February 2022, they announced they are expecting their first child together. Their son was born on 28 June 2022.

On 6 October 2022, Burgess announced that she became a United States citizen.

References

1985 births
Australian ballroom dancers
Living people
People from Wagga Wagga
Participants in American reality television series
Australian expatriates in the United States
21st-century Australian dancers
Dancing with the Stars (American TV series) winners
Naturalized citizens of the United States